Beyond the Sea may refer to:

Music 
 "Beyond the Sea" (song), a popular 1946 song
 Beyond the Sea (Dark Moor album), 2005
 Beyond the Sea (K album), 2006
 Beyond the Sea, a 2004 album by Frank Marocco

Film and television 
 Beyond the Sea (2004 film), a film about Bobby Darin starring Kevin Spacey
 Beyond the Sea (1991 film), an Israeli drama film 
 Beyond the Sea (audio drama), an audio drama based on the TV series Doctor Who
 "Beyond the Sea" (Generator Rex), an episode of Generator Rex
 "Beyond the Sea" (The X-Files), an episode of The X-Files